Asrar is a Persian-language reformist daily newspaper published in Tehran, Iran.

Profile
Asrar has a reformist political leaning. Following the presidential elections held in June 2009 the paper was banned temporarily along with other reformist publications. In December 2009, the ministry of culture warned the paper for publishing "divisive" material. On 30 May 2010, the managing editor of Asrar was found guilty by the press jury for publishing incorrect news.

See also
List of newspapers in Iran

References

External links
 Official website

2006 establishments in Iran
Newspapers published in Tehran
Persian-language newspapers
Publications established in 2006